The Valencia Open, formerly known as Open de Tenis Comunidad Valenciana, was a professional men's tennis tournament played in Valencia, Spain. It was part of the Association of Tennis Professionals (ATP) Tour. The tournament was first played in Valencia in 1995 before moving to the Club de Tenis Puente Romano in Marbella for the 1996 and 1997 editions. From 1998 to 2002, the event was held in Mallorca, and finally, in 2003, moved back to its location in Valencia.

It was an ATP International Series tournament held on outdoor clay courts until 2008. In 2009, the Valencia Open and the Madrid Masters switched calendar dates and surfaces, with the Madrid Masters becoming an outdoor clay court tournament and Valencia getting into the ATP World Tour 500 series category as an indoor hardcourt tournament held in November at the newly opened L'Agora in Ciutat de les Arts i les Ciències. In 2015, the tournament was downgraded to the ATP World Tour 250 series. It ended with the 2015 event.

Past finals 

In singles, David Ferrer has the record for most titles (three) and most finals (five).  In doubles, Alexander Peya and Bruno Soares have the record for most wins (two).

Singles

Doubles

External links 
 
 ATP tournament profile

 
Defunct tennis tournaments in Spain
Hard court tennis tournaments
Recurring sporting events established in 1995
Recurring sporting events disestablished in 2015
ATP Tour 500
Indoor tennis tournaments